Boas Notícias is the twentieth studio album and the fourteenth in the Portuguese by Brazilian singer and TV host Xuxa Meneghel. It was released on September 22, 1997 by Som Livre. It was the last Xuxa album to be released as a cassette.

The album follows the style of the three discs previously released, focusing on the children and youth audience, but this time betting more on pop and axé. Boas Notícias, was certified platinum disc by Associação Brasileira de Produtores de Discos (ABPD).

Background and production
After the celebrations of 10 years of Globo TV and the success of the album Tô de Bem com a Vida (1996), Xuxa was preparing to debut a new program on Rede Globo, Planeta Xuxa. The production of the new album begins with the ordering of themes for the new evening attraction, thus arises the songs "Planeta Xuxa" and "Libera Geral". Including, initially Libera Geral would be the track that would give title to the album. This possibility was worked until July 1997.

In addition to bringing a bit of pop, something that had been left out of the previous release, it is possible to note that little by little, Xuxa was bringing back more childish songs to his records like the case of "Preste Atenção", "Agora eu Vou Andar (Andar Devagarinho)" and "Godofredo, o Piolho".

The axé that was high at the time and began to become one of the marks of the albums of the 90s of Xuxa, also influences the album. In addition to 	"Xuxa Lelê" and "Libera Geral", "Diet" was included, composition of Carlinhos Brown that would be part of the carnival album that would be released in early 1997, but was canceled.

"Na Hora em Que Você Quiser Chegar", it is highlighted because it was made up of the blonde's great desire to become a mother. The presenter had been discussing for some time the desire to have a child and out of curiosity, Xuxa discovered in December 1997 that she was pregnant.

For Boas Notícias, the singer decided to take quite different pictures. On the day of the rehearsal, Xuxa carried a suitcase with dozens of wigs that were used in the photo essay. The pictures with the brown wig were published in Manchete magazine in 1997 and none of them were used in the album. Another part of the essay was published in the magazine Caras that same year.

The album was produced by Michael Sullivan, wears the artistic direction of Aramis Barros, was recorded in the studios: Som Livre and had co-production Zé Henrique, Marlene Mattos and Xuxa Meneghel.

Release and reception
Boas Notícias It was released on September 22, 1997 in CD and cassette format. Boas Notícias, was certified platinum disc by Associação Brasileira de Produtores de Discos (ABPD), for more than 500,000 copies sold reached, #15 position among the 50 best-selling albums of Brazil, according to Billboard.

Promotion
The release of Boas Notícias only really began in August 1997 when Xuxa began to present the album's songs in their shows. "Xuxa Lelê", "Agora eu Vou Andar (Andar Devagarinho)" and "Super Hiper" (that soon after was discarded from the album) were the first ones shown to the public in Xuxa Park. "Libera Geral" and "Planeta Xuxa" were already known by the public for being themes of the same name program and presented in the shows of the second phase of the Tour Tô de bem com a Vida.

Still in August, a single was distributed to the radios of all Brazil with the songs "Boas Notícias" and "Serenata do Grilo". Entitled Xuxa 97, the single received this name because the album still did not have a definite name.

On September 28, 1997, Xuxa held a free concert at Parque do Carmo in São Paulo to announce the launch of Boas Noticias. The presentation was attended by more than 200 thousand people. After the event, more songs from the album will be included in the set of the Tour Tô de bem com a Vida and the singles are performed at Santa's Arrival in Porto Alegre.

The following month, the Queen of Children stars in a Children's Day special that featured music videos: "Xuxa Lelê", "Amarelinha (Pulando, Pulando)", "Serenata do Grilo", "Boas Notícias" and "Oração de um Novo Milênio". Much of this special, just as his video were recorded in Fortaleza, Ceará. In addition to the videos, a show was held at Beach Park where the blonde introduced some of the songs from her most recent release. The song "Meu Xamego" also won a music videos that year, but recorded for the Christmas special, as well as the discarded "Celeiro do Mundo".

Still in the week of the children's day, Xuxa decided to make a live edition of Planet Xuxa on the eve of the holiday. The blonde sang some of the songs that were already known by the audience and distributed CDs to the audience. Also from the live edition, the release of the disc was incorporated into the scenario of the Planeta. The photos of the rehearsal for the Xuxa Dance album that adorned the scenery were replaced by pictures from the rehearsal for Boas Notícias, photos of the children's day special and the show Tô de bem e a Vida. In addition to the floor that was changed to an image with the label of the new release and a red strip written Boas Notícias.

On the Queen's official website, the songs "Planeta Xuxa", "Libera Geral" and "Amarelinha (Pulando, Pulando)" were made available in two versions: those of the album and those specially made for the TV show.

Unlike previous albums, the Boas Notícias tour only took place the following year. The show premiered on February 20 in Santos, São Paulo on Gonzaga Beach. The show brought together about 100,000 people on the scene.

In addition to the concerts, music videos and performances, the commercial album was shown several times in the programming of Rede Globo in 3 different versions: two versions of 30 seconds and one of ten seconds. In all of them, Xuxa images were displayed singing the working songs of the disc in their programs.

Track listing

Personnel
Produced: Michael Sullivan and Zé Henrique
Art Direction: Aramis Barros
Recording Technician: Edu Oliveira, Sérgio Rocha and Mário Jorge
Recorded in the studios: Som Livre
Co-production: Zé Henrique, Marlene Mattos and Xuxa Meneghel
Mixing Technicians: Jorge 'Gordo' Guimarães
Production Assistant: Duda Nogueira
Studio Coordination: Helio de Freitas
Makeup: Free Sound and Sergio Seabra

Certifications

References

External links 
 Boas Notícias at Discogs

1997 albums
Xuxa albums
Som Livre albums
Portuguese-language albums